The Volkswagen CrossBlue is a concept diesel plug-in-hybrid mid size crossover SUV, intended to sit in the range of SUVs by Volkswagen, below the Volkswagen Touareg. The concept version of the car has six seats, but the production version that will be based on it will have a traditional seven seat layout.

It is meant to replace the slow selling minivan, the Volkswagen Routan, and intended to be sold exclusively in the American and Canadian markets. However, Volkswagen of Australia is currently trying to convince Volkswagen executives to have the concept appear in Australian Auto Shows.

In the American and Canadian markets, its targeted competitors are the Toyota Highlander, Toyota 4Runner, Ford Explorer, and Honda Pilot. On July 14, 2014, Volkswagen announced that the CrossBlue will be built at its factory in Chattanooga, Tennessee.

The production version was announced with the name Atlas or Teramont for those manufactured in the USA and Chinese markets for those manufactured in China. Atlas will feature transverse mounted engines of four cylinders or Volkswagens narrow angle V6.

CrossBlue Coupé Concept

At the September 2013 Auto Shanghai, Volkswagen revealed a different, sportier version of the car, named Volkswagen CrossBlue Coupé.

References

External links

Volkswagen CrossBlue concept (2013 NAIAS Detroit)
Volkswagen Australia SUV Range

2010s cars
Cars introduced in 2013
Crossover sport utility vehicles
Front-wheel-drive vehicles
Hybrid sport utility vehicles
Mid-size sport utility vehicles
CrossBlue